The Tale of the Nisan Shaman (also spelled "Nishan") is a Manchu folk tale about a female shaman who resurrects the son of a rich landowner.

Versions
Variants of the tale are also found among the Evenk, Daur, and Nanai peoples. The tale was transmitted orally, and manuscripts were rare; Soviet ethnographer A. V. Grebenshchikov managed to purchase two during his early research trips to Northeast China in 1908 and 1909, the first near Qiqihar, and the second at Aigun. He had a third manuscript given to him in Vladivostok in 1913 by a man named Dekdenge. The Qiqihar manuscript shows some unusual features in its orthography; in particular, the verbal tense markers therein are written separately from their base verbs, whereas the standard practise in written Manchu is to write them attached to the base verb. A 1930s ethnographic survey by Johnson Ling of the Academia Sinica recorded 18 different versions of the tale among Nanai tribes on the Songhua River. , based on Grebenshchikov's manuscript, was the first Russian translation. In 1969, an English translation was made by George Meszoly, a Harvard University undergraduate; however, it was never published. Seong Baek-in (then of Myongji University) made a Korean translation five years later. The first published English translation, relied on the annotations in Volkova's and Seong's works, but did not refer to Ling's study. A Hungarian translation came out in 1987.

See also
 Shamanism in Siberia
 Shamanism in the Qing dynasty

References

Notes

Sources

Translations

Further reading
 
 
 
 

Manchu culture
Asian shamanism
Shamanism in China